Kathryn Walker is an American theater, television and film actress.

Biography
Walker was born in Philadelphia, Pennsylvania. She is a Phi Beta Kappa graduate of Wells College in Aurora, New York, and was a Fulbright Scholar in music and drama.

Walker's career began on the off-Broadway New York stage with her performance in Slag in 1971. On Broadway she appeared in The Good Doctor (1974), A Touch of the Poet (1977), Private Lives (1983) and Wild Honey (1986), among others. She also has been a sporadic presence on daytime drama, including Search for Tomorrow and Another World, and received an Emmy award for her outstanding performance as First Lady Abigail Adams in PBS's 13-part epic miniseries The Adams Chronicles (1976). On film, she has co-starred or played secondary femme roles in Blade (1973), Slap Shot (1977), Girlfriends (1978), and Rich Kids (1979), and she also played John Belushi's wife in the dark, oddball comedy Neighbors (1981). Walker also narrated the 2004 PBS reality series, "Colonial House," based on the format of experiential history. 

With the late William Alfred, she co-founded The Athens Street Company. In 1997, she was Rothschild Artist in Residence at Radcliffe College. Her six-part documentary series The Millennium Journal has been shown on the PBS cable channel, Metro Arts. Over the years, she has become a strong force outside of acting. She has helmed many of the 92nd Street Y's classical theater productions, directing and/or adapting such plays as Euripides' "Hekabe" (2004); Sophocles' "Elektra" (2002); Euripides' "Medea" (2001); "The Bacchae of Euripides" (2000); and her own adaptation of Fagles' "The Iliad" (2006). She lives in both New York City and Tesuque, New Mexico. 

In 2008, Walker published a novel, A Stopover in Venice (Knopf).

Personal life 
Walker's relationship with writer Douglas Kenney lasted until his death in 1980 at the age of 33. She was married to singer James Taylor from 1985 to 1996.

In popular culture
Walker was portrayed in the film Burton & Taylor by Sarah Hadland, and by Emmy Rossum in the film A Futile and Stupid Gesture.

Filmography

Film

Television

Broadway
 The Good Doctor (1973–1974)
 Mourning Pictures (1974)
 Kid Champion (1975) as Jill McDill
 A Touch of the Poet (1977–1978) as Sara Melody
 Private Lives (1983) as Amanda Prynne and, in other shows, as Sybil Chase
 Wild Honey (1986–1987) as Anna Petrovna

References

External links

Kathryn Walker(Aveleyman)

Living people
21st-century American novelists
Actresses from Pennsylvania
American film actresses
American stage actresses
American television actresses
American women novelists
Harvard University alumni
Actresses from Philadelphia
Wells College alumni
21st-century American women writers
20th-century American actresses
Year of birth missing (living people)
Fulbright alumni